Shady Glen, officially Shady Glen Dairy Stores, is a restaurant in Manchester, Connecticut. John and Bernice Rieg opened the first Shady Glen store near the Manchester/Bolton town line in 1948 and a second store in the Manchester Parkade shopping center in 1965. The second location closed in 2020 during the COVID-19 pandemic.

Shady Glen is locally famous for its homemade-style ice cream, signature Bernice Original "winged" cheeseburger, and vintage 1950s style diner and service. In 2012, it was recognized by the James Beard Foundation as an "American Classic".

History of Shady Glen Dairy Farm and Store
In 1946 John and Bernice Rieg decided to expand their farm into making and selling ice cream.  The University of Connecticut at the time had a strong program for helping farmers to diversify, and the Riegs worked with Leonard R. Dowd, Professor of Dairy Manufacturing in UConn’s Department of Animal Industries, on their first formulas for ice cream.

Bernice Original "winged" cheeseburger
Ice cream sold well during the summer months but to some extent ice cream sales are seasonal, and emphasis was therefore placed on developing a sandwich menu.  After much experimenting, Bernice invented the “Bernice Original” cheeseburger in 1949. What makes the Bernice Original unique as far as cheeseburgers are concerned is the way the cheese is prepared and presented: it is fried directly on the grill until it has four crisp corners, or wings, and these protrude far out from under the top bun like a crown when the burger is served.

The "Bernice Original" drew the attention of the Food Network's show The Best Thing I Ever Ate and was featured on their "Cheesy" episode, Season 2, Episode 3.

Change in cheese controversy
In early summer 2010, the Bernice Original -- named "the best burger in Hartford County" -- was accidentally altered due to what the owners of Shady Glen say is their cheese distributor's recipe having changed. Subsequently, the owners announced they had managed to acquire cheese in the proper formulation from a different distributor.

A family business
It was the example set by John and Bernice – their sincere concern for customer and employee alike – which induced William J. Hoch’s father to request work for his son, a cousin of the Riegs, in 1953.  Starting at the age of 15, William paid his way through high school and college while working part-time at Shady Glen.  In 1970 after 17 years with the company, he became Executive Manager in complete charge of operations.

John C. Rieg died on August 1, 2003 at the age of 89 and Bernice A. Rieg died on August 30, 2007 at the age of 91.  Ownership passed on to Executive Manager William J. Hoch and his wife Annette after Bernice's death; William passed away on May 25, 2017.  Shady Glen is now run by William Hoch's son.

See also

 List of hamburger restaurants

References

Buildings and structures in Hartford County, Connecticut
Companies based in Manchester, Connecticut
Economy of Manchester, Connecticut
Hamburger restaurants in the United States
Restaurants established in 1948
Restaurants in Connecticut
Tourist attractions in Hartford County, Connecticut